Therese is a female given name.

Therese or variation, may also refer to:

Places
Thérèse Island, Seychelles; an island
Val Thérèse, Ontario, Canada

Other people
Saints named Therese
Allah Thérèse (died 2020) Ivorian singer
Fabianne Therese, U.S. actress
Louise Marie Thérèse (The Black Nun of Moret) (1658-1730)
Madame Therese (1706-1729) Dutch madam Amsterdam brothelkeep

Fiction
Thérèse (film), French 1986 film about Ste.Therese of Liseux
Therese (2013 film), U.S. film
Thérèse (opera), an opera by Jules Massenet
Thérèse the Philosopher (novel) 1748 French novel
Madame Thérèse (novel)
Therese (novel), 1928 novel

Other uses
Saint Therese (disambiguation)
Marie Thérèse (disambiguation)
Thérèse – Vivre d'amour (album) 2013 album

See also

 
 
 
Teréz Brunszvik (1775–1861), member of the Hungarian nobility, pedagogue
Thérèse-De Blainville (federal electoral district), Quebec, Canada
Thérèse-De Blainville Regional County Municipality, Quebec, Canada
Therese and Isabelle (1968 film)
Therese Raquin (disambiguation)
Thérèse Desqueyroux (disambiguation)
Teressa (disambiguation)
Teresa (disambiguation)
Tess (disambiguation)